The Consegi declaration is a joint letter issued in September 2008 at a free and open technology convention, in which a number of government open source software representatives for the developing world (Brazil, South Africa, Venezuela, Ecuador, Cuba and Paraguay) state disappointment in the appeals by several of their ISO/IEC national bodies being dismissed by the ISO and IEC technical management boards in the Standardization of Office Open XML, and criticize the ISO/IEC for "inability to follow its own rules".

As a consequence of this, the signers assert that they will re-assess the credibility of ISO/IEC, and that they will no longer consider ISO standards to be automatically valid for government use.

See also
Standardization of Office Open XML

External links

Computer file formats
Free software culture and documents
ISO standards
XML-based standards